Michael MacAuliffe, also known as Max Arthur Macauliffe (11 September 1838 − 15 March 1913) and Max Singh Metcalfe, was a senior British administrator, prolific scholar and author. MacAuliffe is renowned for his partial translation of Sikh scripture Guru Granth Sahib and history into English.

Early life and education
MacAuliffe was born in Ireland at Newcastle West, County Limerick, on 10 September 1841. He was educated at Newcastle School, Limerick, and Springfield College. He attended Queen's College Galway between 1857 and 1863, being awarded junior scholarships in the Literary Division of the Arts Faculty for 1857–58, 1858–59, and 1859–60. He was awarded a B.A. degree with first class honours in Modern Languages in 1860. He obtained a senior scholarship in Ancient Classics for 1860-1, and a senior scholarship in Modern Languages and History for 1861-62. He also served as Secretary of the college's Literary and Debating Society for the 1860–61 session.

Career
MacAuliffe entered the Indian Civil Service in 1862, and arrived in the Punjab in February 1864. He was appointed Deputy Commissioner of the Punjab in 1882, and a Divisional Judge in 1884. He retired from the Indian Civil Service in 1893.

MacAuliffe also wrote a rendition, English translation of the Sacred scriptures of the Sikh religion, the Guru Granth Sahib. He also wrote The Sikh Religion: its Gurus, Sacred Writings and Authors (six volumes, Oxford University Press, 1909). He was assisted in his works by Pratap Singh Giani, a Sikh scholar.

MacAuliffe converted to Sikhism in the 1860s and was even derided by his employers for having "turned a Sikh".

His personal assistant remarked in his memoirs that on his death bed, MacAuliffe could be heard reciting the Sikh morning prayer, Japji Sahib, ten minutes before he died.

MacAuliffe is held in high esteem amongst Sikh communion, for his translation into English of the Sikh Scriptures, the Guru Granth Sahib. At a lecture at the annual session of the Lahore Singh Sabha Macauliffe proclaimed that the Guru Granth was matchless as a book of holy teachings.

He was awarded the degree of M.A. (honoris causa) by his alma mater in 1882. MacAuliffe died in the United Kingdom at his home in London on 15 March 1913.

Publications
 The Sikh Religion Vol I (1909)
 The Sikh Religion Vol II (1909)
 The Sikh Religion Vol III (1909)
 The Sikh Religion Vol IV (1909)
 The Sikh Religion Vol V (1909)
 The Sikh Religion Vol VI (1909)
 Translation of the Japji - M. Macauliffe

References

External links
 
 The Sikh Religion, Volume 1
 Max Arthur Macauliffe : First Western Gateway To Study of Sikhism
 Max Arthur Macauliffe – He Introduced Sikhi to the English-Speaking West
 
 

1841 births
1913 deaths
British people in colonial India
People from Newcastle West
Converts to Sikhism
Irish Sikhs
Sikh writers